Chris Pritchard (born 2 January 1983) was a professional cyclist who has competed on the track and the road. Born in Sheffield, England, Pritchard took up competitive cycling at the age of 25 after previously racing motorcycles. 

He subsequently joined the Glasgow Life Track Cycling Team in September 2013. Pritchard represented Scotland at the 2010 Commonwealth Games and the 2014 Commonwealth Games in Glasgow, where he attracted attention for proposing to his girlfriend immediately after finishing his final race in the keirin competition. He qualifies to compete for Scotland through his mother, a native of Linwood, Renfrewshire.

Following a successful streaming service, Chris decided to make his own cycling-themed news show where he discusses the latest cycling-related news stories.

References

External links
 

Living people
1983 births
Cyclists from Yorkshire
Commonwealth Games competitors for Scotland
Sportspeople from Sheffield
Cyclists at the 2010 Commonwealth Games
Cyclists at the 2014 Commonwealth Games